Ian Campbell (15 May 1928 – 11 November 2022) was a Chilean rugby union footballer, of Scottish descent. He played as a fly-half and a centre. He is considered one of the best Chilean rugby players of all time, and was inducted into the IRB Hall of Fame in 2012.

Early life 
His father, Colin Campbell, was a Scottish-born emigrant, businessman, and amateur football player, who had played for Chile in the 1910 South American Championship.

Career 
Campbell followed in the rugby footsteps of his older brother Donald Campbell, a Chile international who had been killed in action in 1944 while serving with the Royal Air Force. The younger Campbell began playing rugby at the Saint Peter's School, in Valparaíso. He went to play for Prince of Wales Country Club, where he was also the captain.

Campbell was capped for the first time for Chile, on 5 September 1948 in a historical 21–3 win over Uruguay, in Buenos Aires. In fact, he never lost to the "Teros", when he played in the Chilean side, for the next 13 years. Campbell's best results were the runners-up title at the South American Championship three times, in 1951, 1958 and 1961. This last time, Chile lost narrowly to arch-rivals Argentina by 11–6, with Campbell missing five penalties.
Campbell was then called "the most skilful player in South America".

Campbell left the National team the same year, but still played until the 1970s. After that, he became a coach.

Campbell's grandson, Santiago Fuenzalida, was a member of Chilean U-20 team for 2008 IRB Junior World Rugby Trophy. He was killed in a car accident.

In 2012, Campbell was inducted into the IRB Hall of Fame along with his brother Donald.

References

External links
Profile of Ian Campbell

1928 births
2022 deaths
Chilean rugby union players
World Rugby Hall of Fame inductees
Rugby union fly-halves
Rugby union centres
Sportspeople from Santiago
Chilean people of Scottish descent
Chile international rugby union players